The Copa del Rey 2003-04 was the 68th edition of the Spanish basketball Cup. It was organized by the ACB and was disputed in Sevilla in the Palacio Municipal de Deportes San Pablo between 26 and 29 February 2004. The winning team was TAU Cerámica.

Brackett

Quarterfinals

Semifinals

Final

MVP of the Tournament: Rudy Fernández

See also
ACB
Copa del Rey de Baloncesto

External links
2003/2004 Copa del Rey Official Website

Copa del Rey de Baloncesto
2003–04 in Spanish basketball